The Abilene metropolitan statistical area is a metropolitan statistical area in west-central Texas that covers three counties—Taylor, Jones, and Callahan. As of the 2020 census, the MSA had a population of 176,579.

Counties
Callahan
Jones
Taylor

Communities

Places with more than 100,000 people
Abilene (Principal city)

Places with 5,000 to 100,000 people
Dyess AFB

Places with 2,500 to 5,000 people
Clyde
Merkel
Stamford (partial)

Places with 1,000 to 2,500 people
Anson
Baird
Hamlin (partial)
Potosi
Tye

Places with fewer than 1,000 people
Buffalo Gap
Cross Plains
Hawley
Impact
Lawn
Lueders
Putnam
Trent
Tuscola

Unincorporated places
Avoca
Caps
Cottonwood
Eula
Nugent
Ovalo
View
Hamby

Demographics
As of the census of 2000,  160,245 people, 58,475 households, and 40,799 families were residing within the MSA. The racial makeup of the MSA was 81.52% White, 6.83% African American, 0.57% Native American, 1.07% Asian, 7.84% from other races, and 2.19% from two or more races. Hispanics or Latinos of any race were 17.15% of the population.

The median income for a household in the MSA was $32,023 and for a family was $37,805. Males had a median income of $27,647 versus $19,523 for females. The per capita income for the MSA was $19,523.

Transportation

Traffic problems
A few areas in the MSA are prone to traffic problems. These places are along the US 83 access roads (Clack and Danville) especially on the south side of Abilene, near the mall, on Southwest Drive from Elm Creek to the Winters Freeway, and on S 14th near the Winters Freeway.

Major highways

Interstates
 Interstate 20
 I-20 has many business routes through the Abilene Metro Area.

US highways
 US 80 (former)
 US 83
 US 84
 US 180
 US 277
 US 283

State highways
 State Highway 6
 State Highway 36
 State Highway 92
 State Highway 206
 Loop 322
 SH 351

See also
List of cities in Texas
List of museums in West Texas
Texas census statistical areas
List of Texas metropolitan areas

References

 
Geography of Callahan County, Texas
Geography of Jones County, Texas
Geography of Taylor County, Texas